Okechukwu Enelamah  (born 1964) is Nigeria's former Minister of Industry, Trade and Investment. He was nominated by President Muhammadu Buhari to join the Federal Cabinet in October 2015 and appointed to the Industry, Trade, and Investment portfolio in November 2015. He served in this position till 2019.

Education
Enelamah earned a Bachelor of Medicine, Bachelor of Surgery (MBBS) from the University of Nigeria, Nsukka in 1985. He earned a master's degree in Business Administration (MBA) from Harvard University in 1994 where he was a Baker Scholar and Loeb Fellow. He is a member of ICAN (1992) and became a CFA charterholder in 1997.
He earned Dean's List honours in his MBBS graduating class at the University of Nigeria, and was awarded national prizes in the Institute of Chartered Accountants of Nigeria (ICAN) examinations.

Career
Enelamah worked as an Audit Senior and Consultant in 1988 at Arthur Anderson (now KPMG Professional Services). He later worked in New York and London offices of Goldman Sachs in 1993 before joining Zephyr Management as an investment manager where he rose to Principal in the Johannesburg office between 1995 and 1997. Enelamah founded African Capital Alliance (ACA), a private equity firm, in 1997 where he served as CEO until his appointment to the Industry, Trade, and Investment portfolio in November 2015 by President Muhammadu Buhari.

External links 

 Federal ministry of Industry, Trade and investment

References 

Living people
Federal ministers of Nigeria
Harvard Business School alumni
University of Nigeria alumni
20th-century Nigerian medical doctors
1965 births
Nigerian government officials
Nigerian money managers
Nigerian management consultants
CFA charterholders
Goldman Sachs people